Barsauma (Barṣaumâ), nicknamed Bar Sawma, "son of the Lent" in Syriac, was Metropolitan of Nisibis in the 5th century, and a major figure in the history of the Church of the East. Under his leadership the church moved away from Roman loyalties and became increasingly aligned with the Nestorian movement. 

Barsauma had been a teacher and student at the School of Edessa, where his mentor had been Ibas, Bishop of Edessa. Barsauma was excommunicated with Ibas and other churchmen for their support of Nestorian teachings, which had been declared heretical at the First Council of Ephesus in 431. Though Ibas was acquitted of heresy at the Council of Chalcedon in 451, following his death in 457 his associates found themselves expelled from their positions once again. Barsauma and other of Ibas' followers relocated to Sassanid Persia. 

Barsauma became metropolitan of Nisibis, one of the five great archdioceses of the Church of the East. He quickly became a favorite of King Peroz I, who preferred his compliant stance to that of Babowai, Catholicos of Seleucia-Ctesiphon and head of the Persian Church, whom he regarded as a pro-Roman traitor. Over time Barsauma and Babowai's relationship grew openly antagonistic and came into conflict over the issue of the marriage of bishops, which provoked outrage in the Church of the East. Barsauma was instrumental in Babowai's downfall, ultimately leading to the latter's execution by Peroz in 484.

Following Babowai's death, Barsauma became the most powerful figure in the Persian Church, though he was never elevated to the position of Catholicos, or Patriarch. He pursued a policy of pro-Persian, anti-Roman interaction, and under his leadership the church adopted a more Nestorian theology, though it never fully adhered to the doctrine in his lifetime. He headed the Synod of Beth Lapat in 484, which officially declared Nestorianism  as the doctrine of the church as well as disavowed clerical celibacy.

In 485 Barsauma's political enemies consecrated the moderate churchman Acacius patriarch, in the hope that he would prevent the takeover of the Church of the East by the Nestorians, but Acacius, despite frequent quarrels with Barsauma, was unable to prevent the victory of the powerful Nestorian faction. In August a synod was held at Beth Edraï, near Nineveh in which Barsauma and Acacius reconciled and agreed to meet again to resolve outstanding issues.

The following year the proposed council was held in Ctesiphon, however Barsauma did not participate, and the synod agreed to endorse the teachings of Theodore of Mopsuetia as official doctrine and the marriage of all clergymen. During this period, monophysitism spread throughout his archdiocese and Barsauma was faced with hostility from many Christians. Struggling to keep his see, Barsawma negotiated with Acacius to keep his seat.

After the forced closure of the School of Edessa in 489 by Emperor Zeno, Barsauma welcomed the teachers and students and reopened the School of Nisibis, becoming the key centre for Nestorianism in the East.

Barsauma died in 491, according to Bar Hebraeus he was killed by monks from Tur Abdin with the keys of their cells, however he also mentions how his tomb may be found in the Church of Mar Jacob in Nisibis.

Notes and references

Notes

Citations

Sources

 
 
 
 
 Bar Hebraeus, Ecclesiastical Chronicle (ed. Abeloos and Lamy), ii. 72–8.
Stephen Gerö, Barsauma of Nisibis and Persian Christianity in the Fifth Century, Corpus Scriptorum Christianorum Orientalium, Subsidia 63, Louvain 1981

5th-century bishops of the Church of the East
Syrian archbishops
Nestorians
Christians in the Sasanian Empire
491 deaths